Rwanda International Movie Award (RIMA) is an annual award event targeted at Rwandan Filmmakers, producers, actors, cinematographer and other film professionals. The award ceremony does not only target Rwandan filmmakers but also recognizes International film professionals across Africa. The event is being organized by Ishusho Art, a Rwandan Film Institution located in Kigali. Jackson Mucyo' has served as the executive director of RIMA since it was launched.

RIMA has been held annually since 2012. Every year, before the award gala takes place, it is preceded by Rwanda Movie Week, an event which is aimed at involving Rwandan youths in the Film Industry. The activities which usually take place during the Rwanda Movie week includes film screening, film training, film tour and community services across the country.

Categories
 Best Child Actor
 Best Child Actress
 Best People’s Choice Actor
 Best People’s Choice Actress
 Best People's Choice Movie
 Best Short Film
 Documentary
 Best Series
 Best Feature Film
 Best Actor
 Best Actress
 Best Director
 upcoming group / Dynamic Award

References

Cinema of Rwanda
African film awards
Annual events in Rwanda